Colonel Sonam Wangchuk, MVC is an Indian Army veteran, who served with the Assam Regiment and the Ladakh Scouts. He was awarded the Maha Vir Chakra, India's second highest award for gallantry in the face of the enemy, during his successful operation in the Kargil War.

Early life and education

Born in 1964 in Sankar, Col. Wangchuk is a native of Khakshal, a region near Leh town of the Indian union territory of Ladakh. His mother is the sister of Mr Thupstan Chhewang and niece of Kushok Bakula Rinpochhey. He moved to Solan, Himachal Pradesh in the year 1969 at the age of about five years. There he studied at St. Luke's till fourth standard. Later in 1973, his family moved to Dharamshala where he studied at Sacred Heart High School. Here he had close interactions with the Dalai Lama as his father was serving as the security officer of the 14th Dalai Lama.
In 1975, his father was transferred to Delhi. In Delhi he was educated at The Modern School Barakhamba Road, and took a bachelor's degree in History, from the Sri Venkateswara College, University of Delhi.
He cites a relative Colonel Wangdus as the inspiration for his joining the Indian Army, although his father desired him to become a civil servant.

Military career
Wangchuk attended the Officers Training Academy in Chennai and was commissioned into the 4th battalion of the Assam Regiment as a Second Lieutenant. He was posted to Ukrul in northeast India as a company commander. He then served in Sri Lanka as a part of the Indian Peace Keeping Force. He was later posted to the Indus Wing of the Ladakh Scouts. In 1999, at the outbreak of the Kargil War, then Major Wangchuk led an operation against Pakistani troops in the Chorbat La pass, on 31 May which was the first successful operation of the war, for which he was awarded the Maha Vir Chakra. On 21 August 2017, President Ram Nath Kovind released a documentary named "Lion of Ladakh" about the troops under Wangchuk who repelled enemy forces from Chorbat La.

Maha Vir Chakra Citation

Sonam Wangchuk's Maha Vir Chakra citation reads:

Mahavir Chakra (MVC) Awardee: Maj Sonam Wangchuk, MVC

Gazette Notification: 17 Pres/2000,15.8.99
Operation: Vijay - Kargil
Date of Award: 1999

Citation:

On 30 May 1999, Major Sonam Wangchuk was leading a column of The Indus Wing, Ladakh Scouts as a part of ongoing operations in Op VIJAY in the Batalik Sector. The column was tasked to occupy Ridge Line on the Line of Control in a glaciated area at a height of about 5,500 metres. This was essential so as to pre-empt its occupation by the enemy and any subsequent infiltration.

While moving towards the Line of Control, the enemy ambushed the column by firing from a vantage position. In the process, one NCO of The Ladakh Scouts was killed. Major Sonam Wangchuk held his column together and in a daring counter ambush, led a raid on the enemy position from a flank, killing two enemy soldiers. The officer also recovered one heavy machine gun and one Universal machine gun, ammunition, controlled stores and three dead bodies of the enemy personnel.

Thereafter, the officer took stock of all forces along the Chorbatla axis in the Batalik Sector and cleared the axis up to the Line of Control of all enemy intrusions at great risk to his life.

Major Sonam Wangchuk displayed exceptional bravery and gallantry of the highest order in the presence of enemy fire and in extreme climatic conditions in the glaciated area.

Awards and decorations

References

1964 births
Living people
People from Leh district
Indian Buddhists
Indian Army personnel
Recipients of the Maha Vir Chakra
Kargil War
Modern School (New Delhi) alumni